Xerojaale is a small town located the Western Mudug region of Somalia, between Galkayo and Galdogob District.

Populated places in Mudug